Benakovac is a village in the municipality of Bosanska Krupa, Bosnia and Herzegovina.

Demographics 
According to the 2013 census, its population was 35.

References

Populated places in Bosanska Krupa